Kvindelig Læserforening (English: Women Readers' Association) was a membership-based, private library for women which existed from 1872 until 1945 in Copenhagen, Denmark. Its former building on Gammel Mønt (No. 1) is designed by Ulrik Plesner. It now houses the newspaper Weekendavisen.

History

The library initially comprised 1,007 volumes. The number of members quickly grew and it outgrew its premises several times.

In 1910, the Women Readers' Association purchased a lot at the corner of Gammel Mønt and Antonigade. A four-storey building designed by Ulrik Plesner and Aage Langeland-Mathiesen was completed at the site in 1910. It contained reading rooms, a lending department, restaurant as well as  hotel rooms reserved for women on the top floor. The latter was inspired by the Martha Washington Hotel in Nyew York City.

The association gained increased momentum and became a power factor in the 1900s. With 100,000 volumes, its library developed into the largest private collection of fiction in the Nordic countries in the 1930s. In the late 1940s, the number of members began to decline and the association experienced economic difficulties. In 1941, it sold its building to Berlingske Tidende. The Women Readers' Association closed in 1945. The building has later housed Weekendavisen.

Presidents
 1875-1879: Kirstine Frederiksen
 1935–1945: Else Zeuthen

Further reading
 Hvenegård-Lassen, Helle: Kvindelig Læseforening

References

External links

 Kvindelig Læserforening
 Renderings in the Danish National Art Library

Libraries in Copenhagen
Organizations based in Copenhagen
Women's organizations based in Denmark
1872 establishments in Denmark
1945 disestablishments in Denmark
Buildings and structures in Copenhagen
Libraries established in 1872